Clyde Lavell Dickey (December 14, 1951 – January 30, 2003) was an American professional basketball shooting guard who spent one season in the American Basketball Association (ABA) with the Utah Stars during the 1974–75 season. He was drafted in the seventh round (112 overall) of the 1974 NBA draft from Boise State University by the Phoenix Suns, but never played for them.

He was voted All-Big Sky Conference his SR season for the Broncos and remains a fixture in the Broncos record book.

References

External links
 

1951 births
2003 deaths
American men's basketball players
Basketball players from Fort Wayne, Indiana
Boise State Broncos men's basketball players
Phoenix Suns draft picks
Shooting guards
Utah Stars players